West Craigs is the name given to two separate areas of Scotland: 

A suburb on the western periphery of Edinburgh, south-east of Edinburgh Airport and close to The Gyle Shopping Centre, Gogar, Maybury and Edinburgh Gateway station.

A modern residential development between the towns of Hamilton and Blantyre in South Lanarkshire (sometimes referred to as Westcraigs), adjoining the Hamilton International Technology Park and the older neighbourhood of Hillhouse.

Sources

(Google Maps)

Areas of Edinburgh
Blantyre, South Lanarkshire
Hamilton, South Lanarkshire
Populated places in South Lanarkshire